Las Merindades is a comarca located north of the province of Burgos, in the autonomous community of Castile and León. It is bounded on the north-west by the province of Cantabria, north-east by the province of Biscay, south by La Bureba, south-east by Ebro, south-west by Páramos, and on the east by the province of Álava.

History
Located in the north of the province of Burgos, the Merindades are the birthplace of the name "Castilla". Most of the villages of the Merindades were quoted in the "Becerro de Behetrias" at the moment of the creation of the subdivision Merindad by Pedro of Castile.

Administrative Entities

The comarca capital is Villarcayo, although the biggest town in the comarca is Medina de Pomar.

Municipalities (26)

See also
 Province of Burgos

Notes

External links
 website of the Province of Burgos delegation
Mountains in the region
History of Merindades (Spanish)

Comarcas of the Province of Burgos